Mansur ibn Jumhur al-Kalbi was an 8th-century Arab commander and one of the main and most fanatical leaders of the south Arab ("Yaman") tribes in the Qays–Yaman rivalry of the period, playing a major role during the Third Fitna civil war.

Patricia Crone describes Mansur as "a coarse soldier equally devoid of nobility and piety" who was "shunned by devout contemporaries" as he disregarded religion and was motivated solely by his desire to avenge the torture and murder of the Yaman champion, Khalid al-Qasri, by the ardently pro-Qays governor of Iraq, Yusuf ibn Umar al-Thaqafi, in 743.

A member of the Amir branch of the Banu Kalb tribe, he began his career possibly in Iraq, where the tribe had settled, but appears for the first time in Syria as a member of the plot to overthrow Caliph al-Walid II in early 744. After Walid's murder, his successor Yazid III favoured the Yaman faction, and appointed Mansur as governor of Iraq in succession to Yusuf al-Thaqafi, perhaps as a deputy of al-Harith ibn al-Abbas ibn al-Walid. His tenure was brief, as he was soon replaced by the son of Caliph Umar II, Abdallah ibn Umar ibn Abd al-Aziz. During his governorship, Mansur tried to dismiss the governor of Khurasan, Nasr ibn Sayyar, nominating his own brother Manzur as replacement, but Nasr managed to hold out and maintain his post until Mansur's replacement.

Mansur returned to Syria, but soon returned to Iraq, where he fought against the Kharijite rebels under al-Dahhak ibn Qays al-Shaybani. As the Kharijites proved successful, he embraced their doctrine and converted to save his life. He continued fighting alongside the Kharijites until Marwan II's general Yazid ibn Hubayra defeated them in 747. Like many opponents of Marwan, he fled to Fars and joined the forces of the Alid rebel Abdallah ibn Mu'awiya. When Ibn Hubayra defeated Ibn Mu'awiya shortly after, Mansur fled to India, where he managed to become governor of Sind, and even obtained recognition of this post from the nascent Abbasid Caliphate. In 751, however, the Abbasids sent Musa ibn Ka'b al-Tamimi against him. Defeated in battle, Mansur fled to the desert, where he died.

References

Sources 
 
 

Date of birth unknown
751 deaths
Generals of the Umayyad Caliphate
Umayyad governors of Iraq
Arab generals
People of the Third Fitna
Abbasid governors of Sind
Arab rebels
Kharijites
8th-century Arabs
Banu Kalb